Per Gunnar Dalløkken (born 28 January 1965) is a retired Norwegian football midfielder.

He started his career in Folldal IL, and then played for Alvdal IL. He signed for Kongsvinger IL just after the 1985 season. He played only 2 Norwegian Premier League in 1986, but was then ever-present in the seasons 1988, 1990, 1991, 1992 and 1995. He retired ahead of the 1997 season.

References

1965 births
Living people
People from Hedmark
Norwegian footballers
Kongsvinger IL Toppfotball players
Association football midfielders
Sportspeople from Innlandet